The 2018–19 Colorado State Rams women's basketball team represents Colorado State University in the 2018–19 NCAA Division I women's basketball season. The Rams, led by seventh year head coach Ryun Williams, play their home games at Moby Arena, and are members of the Mountain West Conference. They finished the season 8–22, 2–16 in Mountain West play to finish in last place. They lost in the first round of the Mountain West Conference women's basketball tournament to Utah State.

Roster

Schedule

|-
!colspan=9 style=| Exhibition

|-
!colspan=9 style=| Non-conference regular season

|-
!colspan=9 style=| Mountain West regular season

|-
!colspan=9 style=| Mountain West Women's Tournament

See also
 2018–19 Colorado State Rams men's basketball team

References

Colorado State
Colorado State Rams women's basketball seasons
Colorado State Rams
Colorado State Rams